Christiane Wartenberg ( Stoll, born 27 October 1956 in Prenzlau) is a German athlete who competed mainly in the 1500 metres.

She competed for East Germany in the 1980 Summer Olympics held in Moscow, Russia in the 1500 metres where she won the Silver medal.

References

1956 births
Living people
Sportspeople from Prenzlau
People from Bezirk Neubrandenburg
East German female middle-distance runners
Olympic athletes of East Germany
Athletes (track and field) at the 1976 Summer Olympics
Athletes (track and field) at the 1980 Summer Olympics
Olympic silver medalists for East Germany
Medalists at the 1980 Summer Olympics
Olympic silver medalists in athletics (track and field)
Recipients of the Patriotic Order of Merit in bronze